Protogygia biclavis is a moth of the family Noctuidae. It is found in the White Sands National Park, Otero County, New Mexico as well as California, Utah and Arizona.

The wingspan is about 30 mm.

External links
The Lepidoptera of White Sands National Monument, Otero County, New Mexico, USA 1. Two new species of Noctuidae
Occurrence in California
Occurrence in Utah
Occurrence in Arizona

Noctuinae